The 1900 United States presidential election in Michigan took place on November 6, 1900, as part of the 1900 United States presidential election. Voters chose 14 representatives, or electors, to the Electoral College, who voted for president and vice president.

Background
Ever since the formation of the Republican Party, Michigan had been a Republican-leaning state due to the Lower Peninsula’s strong history of settlement by anti-slavery Yankees, who after the end of Reconstruction continued to see the need for solid Republican voting to oppose the solidly Democratic Confederate and Border States. During the Third Party System, heavily Catholic and immigrant-settled Southeast Michigan would lean towards the Democratic Party, which was opposed to the moralistic pietism of Yankee Republicans.

In 1892, aided by favorable demographic changes and a legislative change allocating electors by congressional district, the Democratic Party managed to carry five of Michigan’s fourteen electoral votes, and also elect a Governor and a majority to the state legislature. However, the Panic of 1893 turned expectations or hopes of Michigan becoming a swing state rudely on its head, especially when incumbent President Cleveland stood firm, sending in troops to break the Pullman Strike. In the 1894 elections, only one Democrat maintained a seat in the state legislature, a loss of seventy seats compared to the 1890 elections.

During the 1896 presidential election, the Methodist cabinet counties would turn towards evangelical free silver Democrat William Jennings Bryan, whilst the previously Democratic German Catholic counties opposed free silver and turned to Republican nominee William McKinley as the Church opposed free silver and Bryan’s prohibitionist leanings.

During the following two election cycles, the Democrats regained only a small portion of their 1894 losses in Michigan’s legislature. Both McKinley and Bryan would be re-nominated for the 1900 presidential election.

Vote
Bryan campaigned in the state in early October, relying on a theme of “misrule” in the colonies of Puerto Rico and the Philippines which had been acquired in the Spanish–American War. In a speech at Muskegeon, Bryan argued that Puerto Ricans and Filipinos were taxed without representation.

As McKinley’s running mate, Theodore Roosevelt did not campaign in the state, as it was viewed as safe for the Republicans. All forecasts had the state being carried by McKinley, and in some the state was regarded as so safe as not to be discussed. These predictions were borne out by the election result when McKinley carried Michigan by 58.05 percent to Bryan’s 38.96 percent and all but one county – St. Joseph in Michiana, which would prove the last time until Woodrow Wilson in 1916 when a Democrat won any Michigan county in a two-way race, for the state would become apart from Vermont the most solidly one-party Republican in the nation for the first third of the 20th century.

Results

Results by county

See also
 United States presidential elections in Michigan

References

Michigan
1900
1900 Michigan elections